Ignacio Zoco Esparza (31 July 1939 – 28 September 2015) was a Spanish footballer who played as a defensive midfielder.

He spent 12 years of his professional career with Real Madrid, appearing in 434 competitive matches and winning ten major titles.

Zoco played more than 20 times with Spain, winning the 1964 European Nations' Cup and also representing the nation at the 1966 World Cup.

Club career
Born in Garde, Navarre, Zoco joined CA Osasuna from another side in the region, amateurs CD Oberena. After spending the first months on loan to CD Iruña, he made his La Liga debut on 10 January 1960 in a 2–1 away loss against Real Oviedo, and eventually started in all of his appearances as the season ended in relegation.

In the summer of 1962, Zoco signed for powerhouse Real Madrid, playing only 13 matches in his first year, which ended with league conquest, but becoming a starter from there onwards. In 1965–66, apart from appearing in every minute in the domestic competition, he added nine complete games in that campaign's European Cup, including the final against FK Partizan (2–1 win).

Apart from those two accolades, Zoco won a further six national championships and two Copa del Rey trophies with Real Madrid, totalling 64 appearances in European competition with the Merengues (six goals scored). He retired in June 1974 at the age of 35 and, 20 years later, was appointed the club's match delegate in replacement of Miguel Ángel González, retaining the position until 1998.

International career
Zoco earned 25 caps for Spain, making his debut on 19 April 1961 in a 2–1 away win against Wales for the 1962 FIFA World Cup qualifiers. He was selected for the squads at the 1964 European Nations' Cup, helping the national team to win the tournament, and the 1966 World Cup.

International goals

Personal life and death
Zoco married singer/songwriter María Ostiz (born 1944) in 1974, with the couple fathering three children and going on to remain married 41 years. He succeeded Alfredo Di Stéfano at the helm of Real Madrid's Veterans Association, after the latter's death.

Zoco died in Madrid on 28 September 2015, after a long illness. He was 76 years old.

Honours
Real Madrid
La Liga: 1962–63, 1963–64, 1964–65, 1966–67, 1967–68, 1968–69, 1971–72
Copa del Generalísimo: 1969–70, 1973–74; Runner-up 1967–68
European Cup: 1965–66
UEFA Cup Winners' Cup runner-up: 1970–71
Intercontinental Cup runner-up: 1966

Spain
UEFA European Championship: 1964

Individual
UEFA European Championship Team of the Tournament: 1964

References

External links

1939 births
2015 deaths
People from Roncal-Salazar
Spanish footballers
Footballers from Navarre
Association football midfielders
La Liga players
Segunda División players
Tercera División players
CD Oberena players
CA Osasuna players
Real Madrid CF players
UEFA Champions League winning players
Spain B international footballers
Spain international footballers
1964 European Nations' Cup players
1966 FIFA World Cup players
UEFA European Championship-winning players
Real Madrid CF non-playing staff